Twemlow is a civil parish, containing the village of Twemlow Green in the unitary authority of Cheshire East and the ceremonial county of  Cheshire, England. According to the 2011 Official UK Census, the population of the entire civil parish was 192. Twemlow lies on the A535 road and the West Coast Mainline, which crosses the River Dane via the Grade-II-listed Twemlow Viaduct, built in brick by G. W. Buck, Engineer to Manchester and Birmingham Railway Company, in 1841.

From the 16th to the 18th century, the Booth family were the major landowners.

Twemlow is divided by the Dane from the adjoining parishes of Holmes Chapel and Brereton to the south. The parish is also bounded by Goostrey to the north, Lower Withington and Swettenham to the east, and Cranage to the west. The Dane Valley Way long-distance footpath passes through the parish on its route from Buxton to Northwich.

See also

Listed buildings in Twemlow

Notes

External links
 

Villages in Cheshire
Civil parishes in Cheshire